Lutherstadt Eisleben station is a railway station in the municipality of Lutherstadt Eisleben, located in the Mansfeld-Südharz district in Saxony-Anhalt, Germany.

References

Railway stations in Saxony-Anhalt
Buildings and structures in Mansfeld-Südharz